Cryptandra recurva is a flowering plant in the family Rhamnaceae and is endemic to Western Australia. It is an erect, spreading shrub with densely hairy young stems, narrowly oblong to narrowly egg-shaped leaves and clusters of white, cream-coloured or off-white, tube-shaped flowers.

Description
The lower surface is usually mostly concealed and the tip of the leaf curves downwards. The bracts, floral tube and sepals are covered with tiny, star-shaped hairs and simple hairs.

Taxonomy and naming
Cryptandra recurva was first formally described in 1995 by Barbara Lynette Rye in the journal Nuytsia from specimens collected on the Salmon Gums - Lake King road in 1974. The specific epithet (recurva ) means "curved backwards", referring to the tips of the leaves.

Distribution and habitat
This cryptandra grows in sandy soil between Southern Cross, Coolgardie, the Fitzgerald River National Park and Cocklebiddy in the Coolgardie, Esperance Plains and Mallee bioregions of Western Australia.

Conservation status
Cryptandra recurva is listed as "not threatened" by the Government of Western Australia Department of Biodiversity, Conservation and Attractions.

References

recurva
Rosales of Australia
Flora of Western Australia
Plants described in 1995
Taxa named by Barbara Lynette Rye